Polar drift is a geological phenomenon caused by variations in the flow of molten iron in Earth's outer core, resulting in changes in the orientation of Earth's magnetic field, and hence the position of the magnetic north- and south poles.

The South Magnetic Pole is constantly shifting due to changes in the Earth's magnetic field.

The nearest permanent science station is Dumont d'Urville Station. Wilkes Land contains a large gravitational mass concentration.

 North Magnetic Pole
 1900:  
 1905: 
 1910: 
 1915: 
 1920: 
 1925: 
 1930: 
 1935: 
 1940: 
 1945: 
 1950: 
 1955: 
 1960: 
 1965: 
 1970: 
 1975: 
 1980: 
 1985: 
 1990: 
 1995: 
 2000: 
 2005: 
 2010: 
 2011: 
 2012: 
 2013: 
 2014: 
 2015: 
 2016: 
 2017: 
 2018: 
 2019: 
 2020: 

 South Magnetic Pole'''
 1998: 
 2004:  (estimated)
 2007: 
 2015:

See also
 Geomagnetic excursion
 Geomagnetic reversal
 Polar wander

References

External links
 A map of polar drift over the past 200 years

Polar regions of the Earth
Geomagnetism